Bouzigues (Bosigas in Occitan) is a commune in the Hérault department in southern France.

Population

See also
Communes of the Hérault department
Étang de Thau

References

Communes of Hérault